The Prix Marie-Victorin is an award by the Government of Quebec that is part of the Prix du Québec, which "goes to researchers in the pure and applied sciences whose work lies in fields outside biomedicine. These fields include the natural and physical sciences, engineering, and technology, and the agricultural sciences".   It is named in honour of Brother Marie-Victorin.

Winners

See also 

 List of general science and technology awards

References
 Award winners 

Canadian science and technology awards
Prix du Québec